The Grand Rapids Medical Corridor North Pedestrian Tunnel is a tunnel in Grand Rapids, Michigan connecting the Lemmen Holton Oncology Center with Butterworth Hospital and Helen DeVos Children's Hospital.

Construction
The tunnel passes under Michigan Street, a busy thoroughfare. Construction was accomplished using the New Austrian Tunneling method without disrupting the traffic moving on the street above. The tunnel was mined through glacial till, which was grouted with Sodium silicate to stabilize it prior to digging the tunnel.

In 2007, it received the ABC/WMC Construction Award from the Associated Builders and Contractors–Western Michigan Chapter.

References

Buildings and structures in Grand Rapids, Michigan
Transportation in Grand Rapids, Michigan
Subway (underpass)
Pedestrian tunnels in the United States
2006 establishments in Michigan
Transportation buildings and structures in Kent County, Michigan